Seven Feathers Casino Resort is a 298-room, AAA three-star hotel and casino located in Canyonville, Oregon, United States. The casino is owned by the Cow Creek Band of Umpqua Tribe of Indians. The resort attracts over one million visitors annually.

History

The casino originally opened as the 450-seat Cow Creek Bingo Hall in April 1992. It was then expanded into a casino in 1994, and expanded again in 1999, 2003, and 2009. A 147-room hotel was constructed alongside the casino in 1996, and 151 more rooms were added in 2009. The resort added a 191-space RV park in the summer of 2006.

See also
Gambling in Oregon
 Native American gaming

References

Buildings and structures in Douglas County, Oregon
Casinos in Oregon
Tourist attractions in Douglas County, Oregon
Canyonville, Oregon
Casinos completed in 1992
1992 establishments in Oregon
Casino hotels
Native American casinos
Native American history of Oregon